Kapfenberg , with around 22,609 inhabitants, is the third largest city in Styria, Austria, near Bruck an der Mur. The town's landmark is Burg Oberkapfenberg. Its main employer is the steel manufacturer Böhler.

The town has a swimming complex, a football stadium (Franz Fekete Stadium) used by the club Kapfenberger SV, and an ice rink. The Kapfenberg Bulls is a team in the Österreichische Basketball Bundesliga, the highest professional basketball league in Austria.

In 1970, Kapfenberg hosted the European Team Chess Championship, which was won by the Soviet Union.

Notable people
In alphabetic order
 Melitta Breznik (born 1961), doctor and writer
 Ruth Feldgrill-Zankel (born 1942), politician (ÖVP)
 Erika Kloepfer (1913-2000), painter
 Ernst Kovacic (born 1943), violinist and conductor
 Peter Nehr (born 1952), US-American politician
 Peter Pilz (born 1954), politician (The Greens)
 Brigitte Schwarz (born 1960), mayor of Kapfenberg 2005-2012
 Albin Stranig (1908-1944), painter and sculptor
 Wulfing von Stubenberg (1259-1318), Catholic bishop
 Manfred Wegscheider (born 1949), politician (SPÖ)

References

External links 

  

 
Cities and towns in Bruck-Mürzzuschlag District
Fischbach Alps